The Trouble with Harry is a 1955 American Technicolor black comedy film directed by Alfred Hitchcock. The screenplay by John Michael Hayes was based on the 1950 novel by Jack Trevor Story. It starred Edmund Gwenn, John Forsythe, Mildred Natwick, Jerry Mathers and Shirley MacLaine in her film debut. The Trouble with Harry was released in the United States on September 30, 1955, then re-released in 1984 once the distribution rights had been acquired by Universal Pictures.

The action in The Trouble with Harry takes place during a sun-filled autumn in the Vermont countryside. The fall foliage and the beautiful scenery around the village, as well as Bernard Herrmann's light-filled score, all set an idyllic tone. The story is about how nine residents of a small Vermont village react when the dead body of a man named Harry is found on a hillside. The film is, however, not a murder mystery: it is a light comedy-drama with a touch of romance, in which the corpse serves as a MacGuffin. Four village residents end up working together to solve the problem of what to do with Harry. In the process, the younger two (an artist and a very young, twice-widowed woman) fall in love and become a couple, soon to be married. The older two residents (a captain and a spinster) also fall in love.

The film was one of Hitchcock's few true comedies (though most of his films had some element of tongue-in-cheek or macabre humor). The film also contained what was, for the time, frank dialogue. One example of this is when John Forsythe's character unabashedly tells MacLaine's character that he would like to paint a nude portrait of her. The statement was extremely explicit for the time.

Plot 
The quirky but down-to-earth residents of the small hamlet of Highwater, Vermont, are faced with the freshly dead body of Harry Worp (Philip Truex), which has inconveniently appeared on the hillside above the town. The problem of who the person is, who was responsible for his sudden death, and what should be done with the body is "the trouble with Harry".

Captain Wiles (Edmund Gwenn) is sure that he killed the man with a stray shot from his rifle while hunting, until it is shown he actually shot a rabbit. Jennifer Rogers (Shirley MacLaine), Harry's estranged wife, believes she killed Harry because she hit him hard with a milk bottle. Miss Gravely (Mildred Natwick) is certain that the man died after a blow from the heel of her hiking boot when he lunged at her out of the bushes, while still reeling from the blow he received at the hands of Jennifer. Sam Marlowe (John Forsythe), an attractive and nonconformist artist, is open-minded about the whole event, and is prepared to help his neighbors and new-found friends in any way he can. In any case, no one is upset at all about Harry's death.

However, they all are hoping that the body will not come to the attention of "the authorities" in the form of cold, humorless Deputy Sheriff Calvin Wiggs (Royal Dano), who earns his living per arrest. The Captain, Jennifer, Miss Gravely and Sam bury the body and then dig it up again several times throughout the day. They then hide the body in a bathtub before finally putting it back on the hill where it first appeared, in order to make it appear as if it was just discovered.

Finally it is learned that Harry died of natural causes; no foul play at all was involved. In the meantime, Sam and Jennifer have fallen in love and wish to marry, and the Captain and Miss Gravely have also become a couple. Sam has been able to sell all his paintings to a passing millionaire, although Sam refuses money, and instead requests a few simple gifts for his friends and himself.

Cast

Production 

Primary location shooting took place in Craftsbury, Vermont. Assuming that the town would be in full foliage, the company showed up for outdoor shots on September 27, 1954. To the filmmakers' shock, there was hardly any foliage left; to achieve a full effect, leaves were glued to the trees. Several scenes in the film had to be shot in a rented high school gym because of persistent rain. In the gym, a 500-lb (226-kg) camera fell from a great height and barely missed Hitchcock, and the sound of the rain on the roof of the gym necessitated extensive post-production re-recording. Other locations included Morrisville and Barre, with the shooting lasting up to December of that year. Full details on the making of the film are in Steven DeRosa's book Writing with Hitchcock.

The paintings by the character Sam Marlowe were painted by American abstract expressionist artist John Ferren, who was present during principal photography in Vermont. While there, he instructed John Forsythe in the correct painting technique for his on-screen work. Hitchcock was particularly interested in Ferren's work, for his vivid use of color, which he thought would be resonant with the autumnal colors of New England. The sketch of the corpse, Harry Worp, was done on location by Ferren's wife, Rae Ferren, also a fine artist. Hitchcock and Ferren very much enjoyed collaborating, and as a result of this first project together, he was invited several years later to design the "special sequence" core to the 1958 Hitchcock film Vertigo. The panoramic drawing for the opening credits was done by Saul Steinberg.

Alfred Hitchcock's cameo is a signature occurrence in most of his films. In The Trouble with Harry, he can be seen 22:14 minutes into the film as he walks past a parked limousine while an old man looks at paintings for sale at the roadside stand.

The corpse, Harry Worp, was played by Philip Truex (1911–2008), who was the son of character actor Ernest Truex.

Production credits

Musical score 

The Trouble with Harry is notable as a landmark in Hitchcock's career as it marked the first of several highly regarded collaborations with composer Bernard Herrmann. In an interview for The New York Times on June 18, 1971, Hitchcock stated that the score was his favorite of all his films. Herrmann rerecorded a new arrangement of highlights from the film's score for Phase 4 Stereo with Herrmann calling the arrangement A Portrait of Hitch.

A song sung by John Forsythe's character, "Flaggin' the Train to Tuscaloosa", was written by Raymond Scott and Mack David. Forsythe is not the performer, however. The song is also played over the opening credits, performed by Ray McKinley & Orchestra and released as a single on Decca Records.

A "cash-in" song titled "The Trouble with Harry" was written by Floyd Huddleston with Herb Wiseman and Mark McIntyre. A recording of the song by Ross Bagdasarian Sr. (using the pseudonym of "Alfi & Harry") was released as a single in early 1956, reaching No. 44 on the US Billboard chart and No. 15 on the UK singles chart. A competing version by Les Baxter reached No. 80 on the Billboard chart. The title aside, the record had no connection with the film.

1998 re-recording 
Originally released on October 3, 1955, the original soundtrack was re-recorded in 1998 and released on CD that same year, under the Varèse Sarabande label. All the original music, composed by Bernard Herrmann, was re-recorded at the City Halls, Glasgow, Scotland, on April 29, 1998, performed by the Royal Scottish National Orchestra, under the direction of Joel McNeely.

The re-recording was originally released on CD in the United Kingdom on July 27, 1998 and in the United States on October 6, 1998. It was later re-released in the UK on May 16, 2014 and in the US on July 21, 2014.

Track listing

Reception 
The world premiere of The Trouble with Harry was in Vermont (where it was shot), with revenue donated to victims of a recent flood.

Contemporary reviews were middling to positive. Bosley Crowther, in a mixed verdict for The New York Times, wrote: "It is not a particularly witty or clever script that John Michael Hayes has put together from a novel by Jack Trevor Story, nor does Mr. Hitchcock's direction make it spin. The pace is leisurely, almost sluggish, and the humor frequently is strained ... But it does possess mild and mellow merriment all the way. The performers are beguiling in a briskly artificial style, and there's an especially disarming screwball blandness about the manner of Miss MacLaine." Variety called the film "a blithe little comedy" with Edmund Gwenn "a delight" in the lead role. Harrison's Reports called it "a whacky, off-beat type of film, well directed and acted and quite amusing throughout", though the review cautioned that "it may be received with mixed audience reaction" because of the subject matter. Richard L. Coe of The Washington Post called the film "an odd one—sparkling cider spiked with arsenic and a sprig of poison ivy. Although I can recognize its drawbacks, I must confess it almost made me drunk with perverse pleasure." The Monthly Film Bulletin called the film "a comedie noire that brilliantly maintains its precarious balance between humour and bad taste", adding, "The humour is of a quiet and concentrated kind, with the corpse of the troublesome Harry kept persistently in the foreground, and John Michael Hayes' shrewdly witty script affords Hitchcock opportunities for some typically witty macabre and sardonic invention." John McCarten of The New Yorker was negative, writing, "Alfred Hitchcock, whose work has been going steadily downhill ever since he arrived in Hollywood, skids to preposterous depths in 'The Trouble With Harry.'"

The film was a box office disappointment, earning only $3.5 million in the United States. Although the movie was a financial failure in the U.S., it played for a year in England and Rome, and a year and a half in France.

The film rights reverted to Hitchcock following its initial release. It was little shown for nearly 30 years, other than a showing on NBC's Saturday Night at the Movies network television broadcast in the early 1960s, though there were some theatrical exhibition in 1963. After protracted negotiations with the Hitchcock estate, Universal Pictures reissued it in 1983, along with Rear Window, Vertigo, and The Man Who Knew Too Much, which in turn led to VHS and eventually DVD and Blu-ray versions for the home video market.

See also 
 List of American films of 1955

Notes

References

External links 

 
 
 
 
 
 Profile of Hitchcock at Senses of Cinema website, giving particular attention to The Trouble With Harry

1955 films
1955 comedy films
1950s American films
1950s black comedy films
1950s comedy mystery films
1950s comedy thriller films
1950s English-language films
American black comedy films
American comedy mystery films
American comedy thriller films
Films based on British novels
Films based on mystery novels
Films directed by Alfred Hitchcock
Films produced by Alfred Hitchcock
Films scored by Bernard Herrmann
Films set in Vermont
Films shot in Vermont
Films with screenplays by John Michael Hayes
Paramount Pictures films